The first-generation of the Ford F-Series (also known as the Ford Bonus-Built trucks) is a series of trucks that was produced by Ford from the 1948 to the 1952 model years.  The introduction of the F-Series marked the divergence of Ford car and truck design, developing a chassis intended specifically for truck use.  Alongside pickup trucks, the model line included also panel vans, bare and cowled chassis, and marked the entry of Ford into the medium and heavy-duty truck segment.

Across North America, Ford assembled F-Series trucks at sixteen different facilities during its production.  In Canada, Lincoln-Mercury sold the F-Series under the Mercury M-Series nameplate to expand coverage in rural areas.  The first generation of the F-Series is the sole generation produced entirely with "Flathead" engines (inline-6 and V8).

Development & Design
After World War II, Ford's war time effort towards producing B-24 bombers, jeeps, tank engines, and other military hardware ended. When civilian passenger cars and trucks were put back into production, Ford produced the same truck and car design since 1941. After the 1947 Model Year was introduced, a completely new design was planned, which could appeal to various applications, extending further than just having a single purpose.

The development objective included making the driving easier, with comfortable and roomier cab, and a great customer appreciation. When introduced, Ford's new truck would be the only truck featuring all new post-war design. GM's Advance Design trucks featured an all-new body but was based on a pre-war A platform which were at the time shared with other GM passenger cars. Dodge B series, although fully redesigned, retained an outdated semicircular rear wheel well design. Ford departed from sharing a common platform with its passenger lineup and developed a purpose built truck frame specifically for the F-Series. The new frame, included a third cross-member which enabled extra strength enough to be shared with its medium duty lineup. Also Ford was the only company to offer V8 engines for both Pickup trucks and medium duty trucks until 1954. To better absorb rough uneven roads, and to reduce maintenance costs, Ford was also first to introduce telescopic double-acting shock absorbers to the Pickup truck market in place of the lever shocks and were advertised as the "Aircraft Type Shocks".

Ford additionally invested one million dollars into research and tooling for the new cab dubbed as the "Million-Dollar Cab". Compared to the previous model of Ford trucks, the new cab was 7 inches wider and provided extra headroom. It also included wider doors that were moved 3 inches forward and extending beneath the cab's floor for better accessibility and interior protection from dust, moisture, and drafts. A new flat one-piece windshield was 2 inches higher than the previous generation combined with the larger rear window offering a better all around visibility. The new cab also featured increased foot room, and bench seats with adjustable fore, aft, and rake. To improve comfort, the cab was isolated from the frame using bushing at the front and lever-action torsion links in the rear in order to insulate vibration and noise. Additionally, Ford added more cushioning to the bench seat which were wrapped with springs for improved comfort. The front fenders were also wider and taller and featured single piece like wrap around design that included integrated headlamps. Five-bar horizontal grille had integrated turn signal light into the top grille bar. Rear fenders no longer had the tear drop shape, instead had more rounded and had continuous side body lines. Two openings were added over bold FORD lettering at the nose which left opening acted as a hood release handle.

Three way ventilation system consisted of two vent windows (driver and passenger) and an additional vent was located at the cowl. Ford increase the steering ratio and made it easier to turn. Heavier-duty construction with new channeled steel front bumper was attached directly to the extended frame rails which provided increase rigidity and smooth ride.

The new trucks were introduced in late 1947 (going on sale January 16, 1948). Standard features included, ashtray, glove box, and driver's side sun visor which was unusual on trucks at the time. Options included the "See-Clear" windshield washer (operated by foot plunger), passenger-side windshield wiper & sun visor, and Passenger-side taillight. The F-1 truck was also available with additional stainless steel trim and two horns as an option. All F-series were available with optional "Marmon-Herrington All Wheel Drive" until 1959.

Design of the F-Series truck changed tremendously from 1950 to 1954. From 1948 to 1950, the grille was a series of horizontal bars and the headlights were set into the fenders.  For 1951 and 1952, the headlights were connected by a wide aerodynamic cross piece with three similarly aerodynamic supports. The rear window was wider in these later trucks and the dashboard was redesigned. This new cab was called the "Five-Star Cab".

Models
The first-generation F-Series was marketed in eight different chassis (based on their GVWR), giving them their model names; the F-1 was the lightest-capacity version with the F-8 as the highest.  F-1 through F-3 pickup trucks were offered (forming the basis for panel trucks) and the bare F-3 chassis served as the basis for a parcel delivery truck.  The heavier-duty F-4 chassis was produced as a light-duty commercial truck.  The F-5 and F-6 were produced as medium-duty trucks in three configurations, a conventional, a COE/cab-over (as the C-Series), and a school bus chassis (as the B-Series, no bodywork rear of the firewall).  The F-7 and F-8 were heavy-duty commercial trucks, marketed under the "Big Job" brand name from 1951.

With the exception of bus chassis and parcel-delivery vehicles (which used bodywork produced by second-party manufacturers), Ford shared the same cab design on all F-Series trucks; C-Series trucks moved the cab upward and forward, requiring a higher hood and different fenders than conventional models. Also, F-2 and up used a larger wheel well openings than the F-1 models.

The most common first-generation model was the F-1 with a 6 ½-foot (1.98 m) bed with 45 cubic feet volume of cargo room and 114 inch wheelbase, followed by the F-2 and F-3 Express models with an  bed with 122 inch wheelbase and a single side member located each side over the wheel housing. All Pickup truck bed had a all-steel floor construction with hardwood subfloor to keep it from being dented. Skid strips were now stamped into the steel so they would not come loose, unlike the previous model. The tailgate was strengthened and reinforced using a rolled edge with a tapered truss. Anti-rattle chains had a smooth quiet operation and lengthened to allow the tailgate to open flat to the bed floor, allowing easier loading and unloading of the cargo by sliding.    

Variation by Year:   

1948: Feature a wider, longer, and taller cabs. Model designations for trucks were badged as F-1s. Heater only, No Defroster. Running boards curved over the frame and under the cab.
1949: The most noticeable change on the 1949 trucks was the deletion of the red pinstripes on the silver-painted grille bars. Wheels were painted to match body color, rather than the previous black wheels. Defroster added as an option. Running boards trimmed at the frame for ease of replacement. Passenger Taillight became standard as well as Reflectors on both sides.
1950:  The standard three-speed shift was relocated from the floor to the steering column mid-year. Additionally, the bed lost its structural indents, becoming smooth-sided, and the tailgate chain brackets were now welded to the roll instead of inside it. These changes were kept through 51/52.
1951:  For 1951, the grille was restyled with a large horizontal bar, moving the headlights further apart, painted either ivory or argent, with either painted or chrome headlight trim; the hood trim was also redesigned.  If specified, a V-8 emblem appeared on the front fascia above the grille opening.  The truck underwent several revisions, with the cab receiving a larger rear window and updated door panels; for pickup trucks, the tailgate was redesigned, along with the introduction of a hardwood floor.   
1952: The builder's plate was attached to the inside of the glove box door. While predating a VIN, the information identified the series, model year, assembly plant and production sequence as well as paint code and rear axle gearing.

Powertrain

Engines

Transmissions
All are manual.
 3-speed light-duty, F-1 only
 3-speed heavy-duty, F-1 through F-5
 4-speed (spur gear), F-1 through F-6
 4-speed Synchro-Silent, F-4 through F-6
 5-speed overdrive, F-7 and F-8
 5-speed direct drive, F-7 and F-8

References

Citations

Sources
 

1st generation
Cars introduced in 1947
1950s cars
Panel trucks